Smith-Dorrien House is an office building in Aldershot, Hampshire. It is a Grade II listed building.

History
The foundation stone for the building was laid by General Sir Horace Smith-Dorrien, the General Officer Commanding Aldershot Command, on 4 March 1908. The building, which was designed by Harry Bell Measures in the Victorian style, was completed circa 1909. It was initially used as a barracks institute, a social facility for soldiers to read, meet, study and play games. It was refurbished by Millgrove Construction to provide the main offices for the Wellesley Project, a major residential development by Grainger plc, in 2013.

References

Grade II listed buildings in Hampshire
Aldershot
Buildings and structures in Aldershot